Princess Marie Bay is an Arctic waterway in Qikiqtaaluk Region, Nunavut, Canada. It is located in Nares Strait by eastern Ellesmere Island, and marks the southwestern edge of Cook Peninsula. It is also south of the Sven Hedin Glacier.

Fauna
Its lowland habitat is characterized by wet sedge meadows.

Exploration
Robert Peary's 1898 exploration included this bay.

References

Bays of Qikiqtaaluk Region
Ellesmere Island